Kuřim is a town in Brno-Country District in the South Moravian Region of the Czech Republic. It has about 11,000 inhabitants. It is the most populated town of Brno-Country District.

Geography
It is situated at the confluence of streams Kuřimka and Luční. It lies in the Bobrava Highlands, the eastern part of the municipal territory extends into the Drahany Highlands.

History
The first written mention of Kuřim is from 1226 when the Margrave of Moravia Ottokar I issued a charter about the payment of tithes to the Church of Saints Peter and Paul. It was probably founded in the 12th century during the colonization by Přemyslids. In 1570, the settlement was promoted to a market town, but later lost the title. It was again promoted to a market town in 1785.

On 1 July 1973, Kuřim became a town.

Demographics

Economy
In the northern part of the town is an industrial zone. The largest employer is TE Connectivity Czech, a branch of TE Connectivity.

There is a prison for convicted men aged 18 years and more on the outskirts of the town. It has a capacity of 498 prisoners and employs 260 people.

Sights

The Church of Saint Mary Magdalene was founded in 1226. It was originally a Romanesque building. After it was burned down in the Thirty Years' War, it was reconstructed in its today's late Baroque form in 1766–1772. The rectory was also founded in 1226. The original wooden structure was rebuilt after 1806.

The original medieval fortress next to the church was rebuilt into a Renaissance residence in 1592–1594. Today the Kuřim Castle houses a school and its courtyard is used for cultural purposes.

On the Kuřimská hora Hill is a water chapel of John of Nepomuk, probably built in 1722. The statue of Saint Florian on the town square is from 1679.

Notable people
Mathias Franz Graf von Chorinsky Freiherr von Ledske (1720–1786), Bishop of Brno; died here
Vladimír Petlák (1946–1999), volleyball player
Danuše Nerudová (born 1979), economist and university professor; lives here

Twin towns – sister cities

Kuřim is twinned with:
 Niepołomice, Poland
 Stupava, Slovakia

References

External links

Cities and towns in the Czech Republic
Populated places in Brno-Country District